Carnkief Pond is a Site of Special Scientific Interest in Cornwall, England, UK. This SSSI is noted for its biological interest, including 12 species of dragonfly, and is the only known site in Cornwall for the insectivorous plant Utricularia vulgaris (Greater Bladderwort).

References

Ponds of Europe
Sites of Special Scientific Interest in Cornwall
Sites of Special Scientific Interest notified in 1951